Hef or HEF may refer to:

 Hef (rapper), Julliard Frans (born 1987), Dutch rapper
 Hefeweizen, a type of beer
 Herefordshire, county in England, Chapman code
 High-energy fuel, an experimental aircraft fuel
 High explosive fragmentation, a type of ammunition or ordnance
 Historic Railway, Frankfurt
 Holocaust Educational Foundation, part of Northwestern University
 Hope Educational Foundation, in South Africa
 Hugh Hefner (1926–2017), American magazine publisher, founder and chief creative officer of Playboy Enterprises
 Hungarian Evangelical Fellowship
 Manassas Airport, in Virginia, United States
 Norwegian Humanist Association